Śmieszkowo  (German: Lache) is a village in the administrative district of Gmina Sława, within Wschowa County, Lubusz Voivodeship, in western Poland.

References

Villages in Wschowa County